Thomas Weldon may refer to:

 Thomas Weldon (politician) (died 1567), English politician and courtier
 Thomas Dewar Weldon (1896–1958), British philosopher
 Thomas King Weldon (1826–1894), New Zealand police officer
 George and Thomas Weldon, builders in Mississippi